Josef "Sepp" Dietrich (28 May 1892 – 21 April 1966) was a German politician and SS commander during the Nazi era. He joined the Nazi Party in 1928 and was elected to the Reichstag of the Weimar Republic in 1930. Prior to 1929, Dietrich was Adolf Hitler's chauffeur and bodyguard. 

Despite having no formal staff officer training, Dietrich was, along with Paul Hausser, the highest-ranking officer in the Waffen-SS, the military branch of the SS. Reaching the rank of Oberst-Gruppenführer, he commanded units up to army level during World War II. As commanding officer of the 6th Panzer Army during the Battle of the Bulge, Dietrich bore responsibility for the Malmedy massacre, the murder of U.S. prisoners of war in December 1944. 

After the war, an American military tribunal convicted Dietrich of war crimes at the Malmedy massacre trial. Upon his release from Landsberg Prison in 1955, Dietrich became active in HIAG, a lobby group established by former high-ranking Waffen-SS personnel. He died in 1966.

Early life
Josef "Sepp" Dietrich was born on 28 May 1892 in Hawangen, near Memmingen in the Kingdom of Bavaria, German Empire. 

In 1911 he joined the Bavarian Army with the 4. Bayerische Feldartillerie-Regiment "König" (4th Bavarian Field Artillery Regiment "King") in Augsburg. In the First World War he served with the Bavarian field artillery. He was promoted to Gefreiter in 1917 and awarded the Iron Cross 2nd class. In 1918 he was promoted to Unteroffizier (Corporal). His last Bavarian Army record lists Dietrich as recipient of the Iron Cross 1st class.

Interwar period

In the Weimar Republic
After the Great War ended, Dietrich worked at several jobs, including policeman and customs officer. He joined the Nazi Party (NSDAP) in 1928, got a job at Eher Verlag, the NSDAP publisher, and became commander of Hitler's Schutzstaffel (SS) bodyguard. His NSDAP number was 89,015 and his SS number was 1,117. Dietrich had been introduced to Nazism by Christian Weber, who had been his employer at the Tankstelle-Blauer-Bock filling station in Munich. He accompanied Hitler on his tours around Germany. Later Hitler arranged other jobs for him, including various SS posts, and let him live in the Reich Chancellery. On 5 January 1930 Dietrich was elected to the Reichstag as a delegate for Lower Bavaria.

By 1931 he had become SS-Gruppenführer. When the Nazi Party seized power in 1933, he rose swiftly through the hierarchy. He became the commander of the Leibstandarte SS Adolf Hitler (LSSAH) and member of the Prussian state council. As one of Hitler's intimates, Dietrich was often able to disregard his SS superior, Heinrich Himmler, at one time even banning Himmler from the Leibstandarte barracks. The LSSAH eventually grew into an elite division of the Waffen-SS. Although the unit was nominally under Himmler, Dietrich was the real commander and handled day-to-day administration.

In the summer of 1934 Dietrich played a key role in the Night of the Long Knives. Hitler, along with Dietrich and a unit from the Leibstandarte, travelled to Bad Wiessee to personally oversee Ernst Röhm's arrest on 30 June. Later at around 17:00 hours, Dietrich received orders from Hitler for the Leibstandarte to form an "execution squad" and go to Stadelheim prison where certain Sturmabteilung (SA) leaders were being held. There in the prison courtyard, the Leibstandarte firing squad shot six SA officers, including Edmund Heines. Additional SA personnel identified by the regime as traitors were shot in Berlin by a unit of the Leibstandarte after Hitler told him to take six men and go to the Ministry of Justice to shoot certain SA leaders. Shortly thereafter, Dietrich was promoted to SS-Obergruppenführer. Dietrich's role later earned him an 18-month sentence from a postwar court.

World War II

After World War II in Europe began, Dietrich led the Leibstandarte during the German advance into Poland and later the Netherlands. After the Dutch surrender, the Leibstandarte moved south to France on 24 May 1940. They took up a position 15 miles southwest of Dunkirk along the line of the Aa Canal, facing the Allied defensive line near Watten. That night the OKW ordered the advance to halt, with the British Expeditionary Force trapped. The Leibstandarte paused for the night. However, on the following day, in defiance of Hitler's orders, Dietrich ordered his III Battalion to cross the canal and take the heights beyond, where British artillery observers were putting the regiment at risk. They assaulted the heights and drove the observers off. Instead of being censured for his act of defiance, Dietrich was awarded the Knight's Cross of the Iron Cross. During this campaign members of the Leibstandarte 2nd Battalion were responsible for the murder of 80 British and French POWs, in what became known as the Wormhoudt massacre.

Dietrich remained in command of the Leibstandarte throughout the campaigns in Greece and Yugoslavia before being promoted to command of the 1st SS Panzer Corps, attached to Army Group Center, on the Eastern Front. In 1943, he was sent to Italy to recover Benito Mussolini's mistress Clara Petacci. He received numerous German military medals.

Dietrich commanded the 1st SS Panzer Corps in the Battle of Normandy. He rose to command 5th Panzer Army during the later stages of this campaign. Hitler gave him command of the newly created 6th Panzer Army. Dietrich led it in the Battle of the Bulge (December 1944-January 1945). He had been assigned to that task because, due to the 20 July Plot, Hitler distrusted Wehrmacht officers. On 17 December, Kampfgruppe Peiper—an SS unit under his overall command—murdered 84 U.S. prisoners of war near Malmedy, Belgium, in what is known as the Malmedy massacre. 

 
In March 1945 Dietrich's 6th Panzer Army and the LSSAH spearheaded Operation Spring Awakening, an offensive in Hungary near Lake Balaton aimed at securing the last oil reserves still available to Germany. Despite early gains, the offensive was too ambitious in scope and failed. After that failure, the 6th SS Panzer Army (and LSSAH) retreated to the Vienna area. As a mark of disgrace, the Waffen-SS units involved in the battle were ordered by Hitler to remove their treasured cuff titles bearing his name. Dietrich did not relay the order to his troops. Shortly thereafter, Dietrich's troops were forced to retreat from Vienna by Soviet Red Army forces. Dietrich, accompanied by his wife, surrendered on 9 May 1945 to the U.S. 36th Infantry Division in Austria.

Assessment
Dietrich had the complete confidence of the Führer because of his loyalty; the old political fighter was one of Hitler's favorites. He therefore enjoyed much lavish publicity, numerous decorations and a rapid series of promotions. Dietrich often took gambles, much to the dislike of the OKW, such as when he sent the Leibstandarte division "charging into Rostov" without orders "purely to gain a prestige victory". Once Dietrich was promoted to a Corps command he was at least assisted by competent staff officers transferred from the army; still, the army command had to take some pains to keep him in line.

By 1944 there were clear signs that he had been elevated above his military competence. He reportedly had never been taught how to read a military map. Field Marshal Gerd von Rundstedt considered him to be "decent but stupid" and was especially critical of Dietrich's handling of the 6th Panzer Army in the Ardennes. Even Dietrich's principal staff officer conceded that he was "no strategic genius".

Dietrich's long, personal acquaintance with Hitler allowed him to be more frank than other senior officers in his interactions with Hitler. He was reported by a fellow general to have "railed against the Führer and [his] entourage" with promises to let Hitler know that he was "leading us all to destruction".

Honours 
Golden party badge of the NSDAP
Honour Chevron of the Old Guard
Tank Memorial Badge
SS Honour Ring (Deathshead ring)
Blood Order
Anschluss Medal
Iron Cross 2nd Class 1914, Clasp for 1939
Iron Cross 1st Class 1914, Clasp for 1939
Knights Cross of the Iron Cross, with Oakleaves, Swords and Diamonds.
Pilot’s Badge (Honorary)

War crimes conviction

Dietrich was tried as Defendant No. 11 by the U.S. Military Tribunal at Dachau (United States of America vs. Valentin Bersin et al., Case No. 6-24), from 16 May 1946 until 16 July 1946. On that day he was sentenced to life imprisonment in the Malmedy massacre trial for his involvement in ordering the execution of U.S. prisoners of war. Due to testimony in his defence by other German officers, his sentence was shortened to 25 years. He was imprisoned at the Landsberg Prison in Bavaria. Dietrich served only ten years and was released on parole on 22 October 1955.

He was re-arrested in Ludwigsburg in August 1956. He was charged by the Landgericht München I and tried from 6 to 14 May 1957 for his role in the killing of SA leaders during the Night of the Long Knives in 1934. He was sentenced to 18 months for his part in that purge, after being convicted as an accessory to manslaughter for providing a firing squad for the executions of six SA men. After losing his appeals, Dietrich was returned to Landsberg Prison in August 1958. He was released due to a heart condition and circulation problems in his legs on 6 February 1959.

Later life 
Upon his release from prison he took an active part in the activities of HIAG, an organization and lobby group of former Waffen-SS members. Founded by former high-ranking Waffen-SS personnel, it campaigned for the legal, economic and historical rehabilitation of the Waffen-SS, with success. In 1966, Dietrich died of a heart attack. Six thousand people, including many former SS men, attended his funeral.

Dietrich was married twice: he was divorced from his first wife in 1937 and remarried in 1942. He had three children. Before his second marriage he was a visitor of the Salon Kitty.

See also
Register of SS leaders in general's rank

Notes

References
Citations

Bibliography
In English

 
 
 
 
 
 
 

 
 
 Messenger, Charles (1988). Hitler's Gladiator: The Life and Times of Oberstgruppenfuhrer and Panzergeneral-Oberst Der Waffen-SS Sepp Dietrich. London: Brassey's Defence. . .
 
 
 
 
 
 

In German

 
 Höhne, Heinz. Der Orden unter dem Totenkopf, Verlag Der Spiegel, Hamburg 1966; English translation by Richard Barry entitled The Order of the Death's Head, The Story of Hitler's SS, London: Pan Books (1969). .

External links
 

1892 births
1966 deaths
20th-century Freikorps personnel
Chauffeurs of Adolf Hitler
Members of the Reichstag of Nazi Germany
Members of the Reichstag of the Weimar Republic
Military personnel from Bavaria
Nazi Party officials
Nazis sentenced to death in absentia
German mass murderers
German people convicted of manslaughter
German prisoners sentenced to life imprisonment
German Army personnel of World War I
People convicted in the Malmedy massacre trial
People from the Kingdom of Bavaria
People from Unterallgäu
Prisoners and detainees of Germany
Perpetrators of World War II prisoner of war massacres
Prisoners sentenced to life imprisonment by the United States military
Recipients of the Knight's Cross of the Iron Cross with Oak Leaves, Swords and Diamonds
SS-Oberst-Gruppenführer
Waffen-SS personnel
Members of HIAG
Recipients of the Military Merit Cross (Bavaria)
German prisoners of war in World War II held by the United States